Georg Strobl (9 February 1910 in Munich - 10 May 1991) was a German ice hockey player who competed in the 1932 Winter Olympics and 1936 Winter Olympics.

In 1932 he was a member of the German ice hockey team, which won the bronze medal. He played all six matches and scored one goal.

Four years later he was a member of the German ice hockey team, which placed in the fifth place. He played three matches and scored one goal.

External links
profile

1910 births
1991 deaths
German ice hockey players
Olympic ice hockey players of Germany
Ice hockey players at the 1932 Winter Olympics
Ice hockey players at the 1936 Winter Olympics
Olympic bronze medalists for Germany
SC Riessersee players
Olympic medalists in ice hockey
Medalists at the 1932 Winter Olympics
Sportspeople from Munich